Marc Fitoussi (born 20 July 1976) is a French film director and screenwriter.

Life and career 
After a university degree course in English and art history, Fitoussi joined the Conservatoire européen d'écriture audiovisuelle (CEEA) (European Conservatory for screen writing). It was there that he developed his screenwriting trade. He began also a parallel career as film director, making several short features including Illustre Inconnue and Bonbon au poivre which earned him a nomination for César Award for Best Short Film in 2007. The same year, he directed his first long film La Vie d'artiste, with Sandrine Kiberlain, Denis Podalydès and Émilie Dequenne in the lead rôles. This film won the Prix Michel-d'Ornano for the best work of French fiction at the Deauville American Film Festival. In 2010, his second long film was released, Copacabana, whose action takes place in the Belgian town of Ostend, starring Isabelle Huppert and her daughter Lolita Chammah in the lead parts as mother and daughter.

Filmography

Cinema 
Screenwriter and director
 1999 : Ma vie active, co-directed with Elsa Barrère (short)
 2002 : Sachez chasser, co-directed with Elsa Barrère (medium)
 2004 : Illustre Inconnue (short)
 2005 : Bonbon au poivre (medium)
 2007 : La Vie d'artiste
 2010 : Copacabana 
 2012 : Pauline détective
 2014 : Paris Follies
 2016 : Trainee Day
 2020 : Selfie

Scriptwriter
 1998 : Les Fleurs de l'Algérien dir. Nader Takmil Homayoun (short)

Television
 2006 : L'Éducation anglaise (documentary on French adolescents on a language exchange in England)

External links 

 

French film directors
French male screenwriters
French screenwriters
1976 births
Living people